The 1933 Loyola Wolf Pack football team was an American football team that represented Loyola College of New Orleans (now known as Loyola University New Orleans) as a member of the Southern Intercollegiate Athletic Association (SIAA) during the 1933 college football season. In its first season under head coach Robert Erskine, the team compiled a 7–2 record and outscored opponents by a total of 203 to 54. The team played its home games at Loyola University Stadium in New Orleans.

Schedule

References

Loyola
Loyola Wolf Pack football seasons
Loyola Wolf Pack football